The 9th European Film Awards were presented on 8 November 1996 in Berlin, Germany.

Awards

Best Film

Lifetime Achievement Award

References

External links
Winners
Nominees

1996 film awards
European Film Awards ceremonies
1996 in Germany
1996 in Europe